Claude "Butch" Harmon Jr. (born August 28, 1943) is an American golf instructor and former professional player. He is the son of 1948 Masters Tournament champion Claude Harmon Sr. and has been in the golf industry since 1965.

Early life
Butch Harmon was raised in New Rochelle, New York by Eugene Claude Harmon (1916–89) and Alice Cullen McKee Harmon (1918–70). His father was the head pro at the nearby Winged Foot Golf Club in Mamaroneck. The family also lived part of the year in Florida, when Butch's father served as the winter professional at the Seminole Golf Club. Butch began playing golf from an early age, as did his three younger brothers, Craig, Bill, and Dick (1947-2006), who also all became golf professionals. Butch graduated from Iona Grammar School in 1958 and went to Iona Prep for one year before he transferred to and graduated from New Rochelle High School in 1962. Butch excelled at all sports, and was a star halfback on the 1961 New Rochelle High School football team that compiled a 5–2–1 record.

Tour and club professional
Harmon attended the University of Houston, and served in the U.S. Army for three years, seeing duty in the Vietnam War. Harmon was a PGA Tour player from 1970 to 1971, with one win to his name on the Tour, the 1971 inaugural Broome County Open, which was a satellite event during The Open Championship in the UK. He lived in Morocco for several years in the 1970s, serving as the personal instructor to King Hassan II. He was a club professional in the United States, beginning his career at Crow Valley Golf Club in Davenport, Iowa where he met his now wife Christy. Harmon became well known through his work with Greg Norman, beginning in the early 1990s.

Instructor to Tour stars
Harmon is best known for having been Tiger Woods's golf coach from 1993 to 2004 and Phil Mickelson's golf coach from 2007 to 2015. He has also worked with other major champions such as Ernie Els, Stewart Cink, Greg Norman, Davis Love III, Fred Couples and Justin Leonard, and with younger stars such as Nick Watney and Rickie Fowler. Before semi retiring from the tour in 2019, he coached Jimmy Walker, Dustin Johnson, Rickie Fowler, Gary Woodland, and Nick Watney.

In 2003 Harmon was ranked the top golf teacher in the United States in a poll of his peers organized by Golf Digest magazine, and has repeated as winner of this honor each year since. He runs the Butch Harmon School of Golf at the Rio Secco Golf Club in Las Vegas, Nevada. The school also has a branch in Dubai at The Els Golf Club in Dubai Sports City and The Floridian in Palm City, Florida. He also gives golf clinics around the world.

On April 8, 2008, Ernie Els officially announced that he was switching swing coaches from David Leadbetter (whom Els had worked with since 1990) to Butch Harmon. During Els' 2008 Masters press conference, Els said the change was made to try to shorten and tighten his swing, as well as get a fresh perspective.

Harmon's brothers Craig and Bill are also both top golf coaches, who have made the top 50 Instructors' list compiled by Golf Digest on several occasions. Butch's other brother Dick was the golf professional at the River Oaks Country Club in Houston, Texas from 1977 to 2001. After leaving that position, he established two teaching centers in Houston. Dick died February 10, 2006, at age 58 from pneumonia.

Author, broadcaster
Harmon appears regularly in the media, including work for Britain's Sky Sports. Commentating for Sky Sports at the 1997 Ryder cup, Harmon was asked about the negative press Nick Faldo was receiving from the media in the buildup to the event. Harmon replied, "How can you not like Nick Faldo? He's one of the greatest golfers of all time and he's also one hell of a nice guy."

Butch Harmon wrote the 2006 book The Pro, describing his life in golf with his father, brothers, friends, and the top players he has coached.

Harmon has written golf instructional books under the titles Four Cornerstones of Winning Golf and Butch Harmon's Playing Lessons. He also worked with Greg Norman on his multi-media learning system Greg Norman's Better Golf, which consists of three videos, a book, skill guide cards, and an audio tape; as well as on Greg Norman's book Advanced Golf. Harmon writes a regular monthly instructional column in Golf Digest magazine. Butch has also appeared in an episode of the TV show Pawn Stars in which he taught Chumlee to play golf, along with Corey Harrison.

Professional wins (1)
1971 Broome County Open

See also 

 1968 APG Tour Qualifying School graduates

References

External links
Butch Harmon School of Golf

American male golfers
PGA Tour golfers
Houston Cougars men's golfers
American golf instructors
Golf writers and broadcasters
Golfers from New York (state)
American memoirists
New Rochelle High School alumni
Sportspeople from New Rochelle, New York
1943 births
Living people